The West Bačka District is one of seven administrative districts of the autonomous province of Vojvodina, Serbia. It lies in the geographical region of Bačka. It has a population of 188,087 inhabitants. The administrative seat of the district is the city of Sombor.

Name

Administrative history
In the 9th century, the area was ruled by the Bulgarian-Slavic duke Salan. From 11th to 16th century, during the administration of the medieval Kingdom of Hungary, the area was divided between the Bodrogiensis County, Bacsensis County, and Csongradiensis County. In 1526-1527, the area was ruled by the independent Serb ruler, emperor Jovan Nenad, while during Ottoman administration (16th-17th century), it was part of the Sanjak of Segedin.

During Habsburg administration (18th century), the area was divided between the Batsch County, Bodrog County and the Military Frontier. The two counties were joined into single Batsch-Bodrog County in the 18th century. Since the abolishment of the Theiß-Marosch section of the Military Frontier in 1751, part of that territory was also included into Batsch-Bodrog County. In the 1850s, the area was mostly part of the Sombor District, with some parts in the Novi Sad District. After 1860, the area was again included into Batsch-Bodrog County.

During the royal Serb-Croat-Slovene (Yugoslav) administration (1918-1941), the area was part of the Novi Sad County (1918-1922), Bačka Oblast (1922-1929), and Danube Banovina (1929-1941).

During the Hungarian-German Axis occupation (1941-1944), the area was included into Bács-Bodrog County. Since 1944, the area was part of autonomous Yugoslav Vojvodina (which was part of new socialist Yugoslav Serbia since 1945). The present-day districts of Serbia (including West Bačka District) were defined by the Government of Serbia's Enactment of 29 January 1992.

Municipalities

It encompasses the municipalities of:
Sombor
Apatin
Odžaci
Kula

Demographics

According to the last official census done in 2011, the West Bačka has 188,087 inhabitants.

Ethnic groups

Culture
Sombor is a town of rich cultural tradition: the Roman Catholic church and the Franciscan Monastery from the 18th century, the Perish House originating from the early nineteenth century, the iconostasis of the Big and Small Orthodox church in Stapar are protected monuments registered as cultural heritage, which bear witness to the long history of this town.

See also
 Administrative divisions of Serbia
 Districts of Serbia

References

Note: All official material made available by the Government of Serbia is public by law. Information was taken from official website.

External links

 

 
Geography of Vojvodina

Districts of Vojvodina